A vortex coronagraph is a type of optical instrument for telescopes that blocks out the glare of bright objects (like stars) so that smaller objects near them can be seen. For example, extrasolar planets near their host star as seen from Earth or space telescopes in Earth's solar system. It is a type of coronagraph.

In 2005 a paper described a method for astronomy, by which the light of a parent star could be blocked, while keeping the light from nearby but dimmer exoplanets (or whatever the companion is).

Up until the year 2010, telescopes could only directly image exoplanets under exceptional circumstances. Specifically, it is easier to obtain images when the planet is especially large (considerably larger than Jupiter), widely separated from its parent star, and hot so that it emits intense infrared radiation. However, in 2010 a team from NASAs Jet Propulsion Laboratory demonstrated that a vortex coronagraph could enable small telescopes to directly image planets. They did this by imaging the previously imaged HR 8799 planets using just a 1.5 m portion of the 5 meter Hale Telescope.

Vortex coronographs have been used in conjunction with adaptive optics for astronomy.

A vortex coronograph was used on the Keck Observatory by 2017. The VC was installed on infrared camera at Keck, and allowed bodies to be viewed 2–3 times closer to a parent star than before. HIP 79124 B was imaged at a distance of 23 astronomical units from its host star with a vortex coronograph on the Keck telescope, and it was called a brown dwarf. Next generation VCs are able to dim multiple sources of light. It will be thus possible to use them to image planets around multi-star systems.

See also
Optical vortex

References

External links
High Contrast Imaging with the New Vortex Coronagraph on NACO (PDF)
The optical vortex coronagraph
The Vector Vortex Coronagraph: sensitivity to central obscuration, low-order aberrations, chromaticism, and polarization

Telescope instruments
Astronomy articles needing attention
Astronomy articles needing expert attention